Ptycholobium is a genus of flowering plants in the legume family, Fabaceae. It belongs to the subfamily Faboideae. It may be synonymous with Tephrosia.

References 

Millettieae
Fabaceae genera